KODV (89.1 FM) is a radio station broadcasting a Spanish music format. Licensed to Barstow, California, United States, the station serves the Barstow area. The station is currently owned by Ondas de Vida Network.

Translators

KODV is rebroadcast by 12 translators in the western United States and by low-power FM radio station KGBZ-LP in Madras, Oregon.

References

External links

ODV
Barstow, California
Mass media in San Bernardino County, California
ODV
Contemporary Christian radio stations in the United States